Yale Publishing Course (YPC), located on the campus of Yale University in New Haven, Connecticut, is an intensive program for magazine, book and online publishing professionals.  The course focuses on teaching leadership skills for today's increasingly global, increasingly digital environment. YPC's curriculum is geared to middle and upper-level professionals from all over the world. Its speakers include publishing and media executives as well as faculty from the Yale School of Management and Yale University Press staff. The Yale Course is the only advanced-level program for senior managers in the publishing industry.

The program combines plenary sessions with smaller group discussions focused on specific issues and case studies.  The curriculum includes sessions on such topics as: strategic planning; financial management and entrepreneurship; best practices in the use of new technology and content delivery; legal challenges in multi-platform publishing; licensing and marketing internationally; and the future of digital dissemination. Faculty office hours facilitate one-on-one meetings with students to explore specific questions or challenges.

History 
The Yale Publishing Course was founded in 2010 to fill the gap left by the decades-old Stanford University Publishing Course for Professionals. It builds upon the Stanford tradition and concentrates more heavily on the business and management aspects of publishing as a global enterprise.  It also provides a strong emphasis on understanding and using the latest advances in technology.

The Yale Publishing Course began in 2010 as a one-week session, with students from all over the United States and 16 other countries. Students represented all areas of publishing including administration, editorial, sales, publicity, marketing, design, production, business, new media, and new product development.  For its 2011 program, YPC was expanded to two sessions: one week focusing on magazine and online publishing, and a week-long session focusing on print and digital book publishing.

The course was suspended in 2020 due to the COVID-19 pandemic. It has not run since, announcing in 2022 that it was suspended "for the foreseeable future."

Program advisors 
Program advisors for magazines:

 Mary K. Baumann – Partner, Hopkins/Baumann
 Christopher Donnellan – Executive Director, Rights and Permissions, Condé Nast
 Duncan Edwards – President and CEO, Hearst Magazines International
 Richard Foster – Senior Faculty Fellow, Yale School of Management; Managing Partner, Millbrook Management Group; Lead Director, Innosight, LLC; Venture Partner, Lux Capital
 Joe Galarneau – Chief Operating Officer, Newsweek, and General Manager, Newsweek Digital
 Jonathan Hart – Partner, Dow Lohnes PLLC
 Dorothy Kalins – Director, Dorothy Kalins Ink, and Founding Editor of Metropolitan Home and Saveur
 Peter A. Kreisky – Chairman, The Kreisky Media Consultancy, LLC
 Corby Kummer – Senior Editor, Atlantic Monthly
 Cynthia Leive – Editor-in-Chief, Glamour
 Kevin McKean – Vice President and Editorial Director, Consumers Union
 Richard Stolley – Senior Editorial Advisor, former Editorial Director, Time Inc., founding Managing Editor, People, and former Managing Editor, Life
 Nina Willdorf – Executive Editor, ALL YOU; former Editor-in-Chief, BudgetTravel.com and Budget Travel

Program advisors for books:

 Robert Baensch – President, Baensch International Group Ltd.
 Maria Campbell – President, Maria B. Campbell Associates, Inc.
 Richard N. Foster – Senior Faculty Fellow, Yale School of Management; Managing Partner, Millbrook Management Group; Lead Director, Innosight, LLC; Venture Partner, Lux Capital
 George Gibson – Publishing Director, Bloomsbury Publishing, New York
 Jeff Gomez – Senior Director of Online Consumer Sales and Marketing, Penguin Group USA
 Bruce Harris – Publishing Strategist, Bruce Harris Books
 Leslie Hulse – Senior Vice President, Digital Business Development, HarperCollins Publishers
 Michael Jacobs – Chief Executive Officer, Abrams Books
 Martin Levin – Counsel, Cowan, Liebowitz & Latman, P.C., and former CEO, Times-Mirror Book Company
 Liisa McCloy-Kelley – VP and Director of Digital Production Operations, Random House, Inc.
 Charles Melcher – Founder, Melcher Media
 Kirsty Melville – President, Book Division, Andrews McMeel Publishing
 Carolyn Pittis – Senior VP, Global Author Services, HarperCollins Publishers

Course Director: Tina C. Weiner

References 

 The Bookseller 20/27 August 2010
 http://opac.yale.edu/news/article.aspx?id=7373
 http://opac.yale.edu/news/article.aspx?id=7501
 http://nymag.com/daily/intel/2010/04/yale_publishing_course_will_be.html
 http://martinlevinandfriends.blogspot.com/2010/08/yale-publishing-course-july-18-23.html
 http://www.mediabistro.com/galleycat/yale-launches-new-publishing-course_b11396
 http://www.magazinedojo.com/profiles/blogs/the-power-of-truth-at-yale>http://www.magazinedojo.com/profiles/blogs/trends-and-the-future-at-yale
 http://www.magazinedojo.com/profiles/blogs/international-opportunities-at
 http://publishingcourses.stanford.edu/
 http://stanfordpubcourse.ning.com/

External links 
 http://som.yale.edu/programs/executive-education/for-individuals/yale-publishing-course
 http://yalepress.yale.edu/yupbooks/home.asp
 http://som.yale.edu/

Mass media in New Haven County, Connecticut
Publishing companies of the United States
University presses of the United States
Yale University